IRAS 05280–6910 is a red supergiant star or OH/IR supergiant star located in the Large Magellanic Cloud. Its radius is calculated to be more than a thousand times that of the Sun, making it one of the largest stars discovered so far. If placed at the center of the Solar System, its photosphere would engulf the orbit of Jupiter.

Characteristics
IRAS 05280–6910 is likely an OH supergiant star. It is the most reddened object in the LMC, far exceeding the redness of the famous dust enshrouded red supergiant WOH G64. It also shows the distinct type of maser signal similar to that of VY Canis Majoris.
Its exact radius is uncertain. According to one paper, it is 1,367 times the size of the Sun, while another says that it is 1,736 times the size of the Sun. In either case, it is among the largest stars known.

IRAS 05280–6910 likely had a mass of 20 to 25 solar masses when it formed.

See also 
 WOH G64
 WOH G17
 HV 888

Notes

References 

Stars in the Large Magellanic Cloud
Large Magellanic Cloud
IRAS catalogue objects
Dorado (constellation)
M-type supergiants
Extragalactic stars